The 1993 Volvo Women's Open was a women's tennis tournament played on outdoor hard courts at the Dusit Resort Hotel in Pattaya in Thailand that was part of Tier IV of the 1993 WTA Tour. It was the third edition of the tournament and was held from 12 April through 18 April 1993. Eighth-seeded Yayuk Basuki won the singles title, her second at the event after 1991, and earned $18,000 first-prize money.

Finals

Singles

 Yayuk Basuki defeated  Marianne Werdel 6–3, 6–1
 It was Basuki's 1st singles title of the year and the 3rd of her career.

Doubles

 Cammy MacGregor /   Catherine Suire defeated  Patty Fendick /  Meredith McGrath 6–3, 7–6(7–3)

References

External links
 ITF tournament edition details 
 Tournament draws

 
 WTA Tour
 in women's tennis
Tennis, WTA Tour, Volvo Women's Open
Tennis, WTA Tour, Volvo Women's Open

Tennis, WTA Tour, Volvo Women's Open